Thomas E. Armstrong (born January 22, 1959) is a former Republican member of the Pennsylvania House of Representatives.

Armstrong graduated from Conestoga Valley High School in 1977 and earned a degree in business from Penn State University in 1980. He was first elected to represent the 98th legislative district in the Pennsylvania House of Representatives in 1990. He was defeated in the 2002 Republican primary by David Hickernell.

References

External links
Pennsylvania House of Representatives - Thomas E. Armstrong (Republican) official PA House profile (archived)
Pennsylvania House Republican Caucus - Thomas E. Armstrong official Party profile (archived)

Living people
Republican Party members of the Pennsylvania House of Representatives
1959 births